Virginia Damerini was an Italian opera singer, active in the 1880s and 1890s.

Early life
Virginia Damerini was born and raised in the Apennines region of Italy.

Career
Damerini was a dramatic soprano. In 1884 she toured several American cities from Brooklyn to San Francisco with the Milan Grand Opera Company. During that tour, The New York Times commented that "Signora Damerini's style is both refined and expressive." 

She performed in the premiere of Alberto Franchetti's Asrael in 1888. She sang the title role in Fosca in 1889 at Modena and again in 1890, at La Scala in Milan, with conductor Arnaldo Conti. She sang the "notoriously difficult"  title role in Vincenzo Bellini's Norma with Arturo Toscanini conducting, at Palermo in 1893. In 1893, she was singing at El Gran Teatre del Liceu in Barcelona on the night when the theatre was bombed by anarchist . Her sister Marie Damerini was reported among the casualties in the explosion.

References

Italian operatic sopranos
19th-century Italian women opera singers
Year of birth unknown
Year of death unknown